Tekla is a Latvian, Polish, Georgian, Ukrainian, and Scandinavian feminine given name.

Notable people named Tekla
Tekla Bądarzewska-Baranowska (1829/1834 to 1861), Polish composer 
Tekla Chemabwai (born 1950), Kenyan sprinter and middle-distance runner
Tekla Griebel-Wandall (1866–1940), Danish composer and music educator
Tekla Nordström (1856–1937), Swedish xylographer
Tekla Róża Radziwiłł (1703–1747), Polish–Lithuanian noblewoman

See also
 Thekla
 Tecla

References 

Latvian feminine given names
Polish feminine given names
Swedish feminine given names
Feminine given names